The Miners' International Federation (MIF), sometimes known as the International Federation of Miners, was a global union federation of trade unions.

History
The federation was established in 1890 at a meeting in Brussels by unions from Austria, Belgium, France, Germany and the United Kingdom.  It was initially one of the largest union federations, with membership reaching 1.2 million in 1913, and this grew slightly to  1.5 million in 1931.

From the 1950s, the MIF began to campaign for common international minimum working conditions.  However, with reductions in the number of miners in its heartland of Western Europe, its overall membership began to fall, and was below one million by 1976.

The union was based in London for many years, with the British National Union of Mineworkers (NUM) as its largest affiliate.  In 1983, Arthur Scargill, leader of the NUM, proposed dissolving the federation and forming a new one with the World Federation of Trade Unions-affiliated Trade Unions International of Miners.  This was opposed by a majority of members, but the NUM nevertheless withdrew, leaving the federation to relocate its headquarters to Brussels and struggle with a shortage of funds.

The MIF began recruiting unions in other parts of the world, and by 1994 consisted of 58 unions with 4.2 million members.  In 1995, it merged with the International Federation of Chemical and General Workers' Unions to form the International Federation of Chemical, Energy, Mine and General Workers' Unions.

Affiliates
In 1960, the following unions were affiliated to the federation:

Leadership

Secretaries
1890: Thomas Ashton
1921: Frank Hodges
1927: Achille Delattre
1934: Ebby Edwards
1947: Will Lawther
1957: Ernest Jones
1960: Ted Jones
1963: Dennis Edwards
1976: Peter Tait
1984: Jan Olyslaegers
1989: Peter Michalzik

Presidents
1910s: Robert Smillie
1921: Herbert Smith
1929: Joseph Dejardin
1932: Fritz Husemann
1934: Pierre Vigne
1945: Achille Delattre
1954: Heinrich Imig
1956: Nicolas Dethier
1963: Heinrich Gutermuth
1967: Walter Arendt
1969:
1971: Adolf Schmidt
1984: Anders Stendalen

References

Global union federations
Mining trade unions
Trade unions established in 1890
Trade unions disestablished in 1995